The following is a list of political parties in the Indian state of Tripura, on the national, state and regional levels.

Major national parties
 Bharatiya Janata Party (BJP)
 Indian National Congress (INC)
 Communist Party of India (Marxist) (CPIM)

Major Regional parties
 Indigenous People's Front of Tripura (IPFT) of N.C. Debbarma
 The Indigenous Progressive Regional Alliance (TIPRA) of Maharaja Kirit Pradyot Deb Barman

Minor national-level parties

 All India Trinamool Congress
 Communist Party of India (CPI)
 Revolutionary Socialist Party (RSP)
 All India Forward Bloc (AIFB)

Minor Regional parties
 Indigenous People's Front of Tripura (Balaram Debbarma) (IPFT-B) of Balaram Debbarma
 Twipra Dophani Sikla Srwngnai Motha (TDSSM) of David Hamkhrai Twipra (DH Murasing)
 Tripura United Indigenous Peoples Council (TUIPC)
 Joint Action Committee of Civil Societies of Tripura (JACCST)
 Tripura Peoples Party (TPP)
 National Socialist Party of Tripura (NSPT)  {alliance partner of Left Front}
 Ganamukti Parishad (GMP), affiliated with Communist Party of India (Marxist) as tribal wing.
 Janganotantrik Morcha (JM)
 Tripura Ganatantrik Manch (TGM)
 Amra Bangali (AM)

Note:
There is a move to merge regional tribal parties like IPFT(Balaram Debbarma), TDSSM, TUIPC and JACCST with The Indigenous Progressive Regional Alliance (TIPRA) of Maharaja Kirit Pradyot Deb Barma

Defunct Political Parties
 Tripura Rajya Muslim Praja Majlish  (TRMPM)
 Tripura Upajati Juba Samiti (TUJS) split to form INPT and IPFT
 Tripura National Volunteers  (TNV) merged with IPFT
 Tripura People's Front (TPF) of Patal Kanya Jamatia merged with the Bharatiya Janata Party
 Indigenous Nationalist Party of Twipra (INPT) merged with TIPRA
 National Conference of Tripura (NCT) merged with TIPRA
 Tipraland State Party (TSP) merged with TIPRA
 Indigenous People's Front of Tripura (Tipraha) or IPFT-(Tipraha) led by Aghor & Binoy Debbarma, merged with TIPRA

See also 
 2018 Tripura Legislative Assembly election
Political parties in Mizoram

References 

 Elections.in (Tripura)